The Ernest L. Wilkinson Student Center (WSC) serves as the main center on Brigham Young University (BYU) Campus.  It was originally called the Ernest L. Wilkinson Center but was renamed to its current name at its re-dedication by Gordon B. Hinckley in 1999 after the building had been extensively renovated. It is known by students as "The Wilk".

History
This building, completed in 1964, was named for Ernest L. Wilkinson, sixth president of BYU (1951–1971). Planning for the center took 12 years, and 60 percent of the cost was paid by students. The BYU Bookstore takes up one corner of this building.  Also in the building are food services, including a food court with franchise restaurants, a high class restaurant taking up the sixth floor, BYU catering's central operations and two other places to buy food not connected with any of the above.

The building also has conference rooms, two large ballrooms, a movie theatre, a full-service copy center, a post office and a bowling alley.  There is also a full service salon, Studio1030 and a music venue/restaurant, The Wall. The Wall was opened in 2013 in the location that had previously been Outdoors Unlimited. The building also houses the Dean of Students Office, various counseling and conflict resolution offices, various other student services offices, and a computer lab.

Among specific offices housed in the Wilkinson Student Center are the Center for Service and Learning, Women's Services and Resources, the BYU Career and Counseling Center, BYU Campus Scheduling, BYU EMS, BYU Student Employment, the BYU Honor Code Office, Lost and Found, the BYU Information Center (which also issues bus passes), and the Student Honor Association.  The BYU Faculty Center is also located in the Student Center. The counseling center was started in 1946 under BYU President McDonald and moved to the WSC upon the building's completion in 1964.

When it was first built the Wilkinson Center had an area of 287,539 square feet. The bookstore was expanded in 1974 with an extension further west.  This expansion costs nearly $1.5 million.

After the 1999 renovations, the Wilkinson Student Center had 498,000 square feet of usable space. That renovation moved most student support offices into the building. It also saw the change of the Cougareat to a food court format.

In 2017, the old memorial hall was replaced by the reflection center. Although it still listed BYU students killed in military service, the addition of three paintings, focusing on Jesus Christ and his mission, shifted the room to be more broadly a place for reflection and meditation.

References

Sources
 Wilkinson Center building directory
 Hatch and Miller. A History of BYU Grounds. (Provo: BYU Physical Plant Department, 2001), Vol. 8, p. 18.

External links

Ernest L. Wilkinson Student Center Official site

Buildings and structures completed in 1964
Brigham Young University buildings
Event venues established in 1964
Student activity centers in the United States
1964 establishments in Utah